Aldan is a gold-mining town and the administrative center of Aldansky District of the Sakha Republic, Russia, located in the Aldan Highlands, in the Aldan River basin, on the stream Orto-Sala near its mouth in the Seligdar River, about  south of the republic's capital of Yakutsk. As of the 2010 Census, its population was 21,275.

History
It was founded in 1923 as Nezametny, after discovery of rich gold deposits. It was granted town status and renamed in 1939. During World War II, an airfield was built here for the Alaska-Siberian (ALSIB) air route used to ferry American Lend-Lease aircraft to the Eastern Front.

Administrative and municipal status
Within the framework of administrative divisions, Aldan serves as the administrative center of Aldansky District. As an inhabited locality, Aldan is classified as a town under district jurisdiction. As an administrative division, it is, together with two rural localities, incorporated within Aldansky District as the Town of Aldan. As a municipal division, the Town of Aldan is incorporated within Aldansky Municipal District as Aldan Urban Settlement.

Economy
Aldan remains a productive gold and mica mining center, largely avoiding the large drop in population suffered by most other towns in the Russian Far East in the years after the dissolution of the Soviet Union.

Transportation
The town stands on the A360 Lena Highway, which connects Yakutsk and Never, as well as on the partially complete Amur–Yakutsk Mainline railway. It is served by the Aldan Airport.

Climate
Aldan has the typical eastern Siberian subarctic climate (Köppen Dfc) though it is affected by the Pacific Ocean more than localities in the lower Lena basin, which gives it much heavier rainfall during the summer than most of the republic, as well as a little more snowfall and rather less extreme winter temperatures – though still extremely cold for the latitude and as much as  colder than settlements actually on the Okhotsk coast. In spite of the less extreme winters vis-à-vis more northerly parts of Sakha, Aldan has never seen any day above freezing from 22 November to 7 March inclusive. Although winters are somewhat less extreme than Yakutsk, summers are actually somewhat cooler, and cloudier, than those northerly areas.

The coldest temperature recorded in Aldan since the weather station was opened in 1937 has been  on 20 January 2023 and the hottest  on 3 July 2021.

References

Notes

Sources
Official website of the Sakha Republic. Registry of the Administrative-Territorial Divisions of the Sakha Republic. Aldansky District .

External links
 Official website of Aldan
 Directory of organizations in Aldan 
 Official website of Aldan Youth Theater

Cities and towns in the Sakha Republic
Cities and towns built in the Soviet Union
Populated places established in 1923